Nalinda Ranasinghe (born 20 July 1989) is a Sri Lankan cricketer. He is a right-handed batsman and right-arm medium-fast bowler who plays for Singha Sports Club. He was born in Galle.

Ranasinghe made his List A debut during the 2009-10 Premier Limited Overs tournament against Lankan Cricket Club. He scored 26 runs on his debut, the second highest score on the Singha team.

External links
Nalinda Ranasinghe at Cricket Archive 

1989 births
Living people
Sri Lankan cricketers
Singha Sports Club cricketers
Cricketers from Galle